Feable Weiner  is an American power pop band from Murfreesboro, Tennessee.

Members
 Adam Andersen– vocals, guitar
 Josh Watson– guitar, vocals
 Andrew Samples– bass guitar, backing vocals
 Jeff Horne – drums, percussion

References

American power pop groups
Musical groups established in 2000
Doghouse Records artists